Pittsburg (also Halbsville) is an unincorporated community in Fayette County, Illinois, United States.  Located at  (38.8714354, -89.2117374), it lies at an elevation of 531 feet (162 m).  It was named after the industrial heritage of Pittsburgh, Pennsylvania which, coincidentally, has a Fayette County, Pennsylvania as part of its metropolitan area.

References

External links
Pittsburg, Illinois description at PlaceNames.com

Unincorporated communities in Illinois
Unincorporated communities in Fayette County, Illinois